Frieda Maes (born 28 July 1956) is a former Belgian racing cyclist. She finished in third place in the Belgian National Road Race Championships in 1978.

References

External links

1956 births
Living people
Belgian female cyclists
People from Merksem
Cyclists from Antwerp